Source reduction is activities designed to reduce the volume, mass, or toxicity of products throughout the life cycle.  It includes the design and manufacture, use, and disposal of products with minimum toxic content, minimum volume of material, and/or a longer useful life.

Synonyms 
Pollution prevention and toxics use reduction are also called source reduction because they address the use of hazardous substances at the source.

Examples
 Reusable packaging - for example the use of a reusable shopping bag at the grocery store; although it uses more material than a single-use disposable bag, the material per use is less.
 Overpackaging - Some packaging uses more materials than is necessary for product containment and protection. Redesign can often reduce the size and materials usage in packaging.

Procedures 
Source reduction is achieved through improvements in design, production, use, reuse, recycling, and through environmentally preferable purchasing (EPP). A Life-cycle assessment is useful to help choose among several alternatives and options.

Source reduction in the United States
In the United States, the Federal Trade Commission offers guidance for labelling claims: "Source reduction" refers to reducing or lowering the weight, volume or toxicity of a product or package. To avoid being misleading, source reduction claims must qualify the amount of the source reduction and give the basis for any comparison that is made. These principles apply regardless of whether a term like "source reduced" is used.

The Massachusetts Toxics Use Reduction Program (TURA) offers six strategies to achieve source reduction:

 Toxic chemical substitution
 Production process modification
 Finished product reformulation
 Production modernization
 Improvements in operations and maintenance
 In-process recycling of production material

See also
Bioplastic
Conservation and restoration of rail vehicles
Circular economy
Design life
Litter
Manufacturing resource planning
Miniwaste
Pre-waste
Product life
Remanufacturing
Service life
Sustainable packaging
Throwaway society
Waste

References

External links 
United States National Pollution Prevention Information Center
United States  Pollution Prevention Regional Information Center
NPPR Finds P2 Programs Effective
TURI
P2Gems Pollution prevention directory
Southwest Network for Zero Waste

Waste minimisation
Industrial ecology
Design for X
Industrial engineering